Lemaitre (pronounced ) is a Norwegian indie electronic duo hailing from Oslo. The duo consists of members Ketil Jansen and Ulrik Denizou Lund. Jansen and Lund came together to form Lemaitre on 20 June 2010. Lemaitre is currently based in Los Angeles, California.

Since the duo's inception in summer 2010, Lemaitre has released a number of EPs, including the Relativity Series: Relativity 1, 2, 3 and Relativity by Nite; The Friendly Sound; and Singularity.

The duo released their seventh EP, 1749, on 29 January 2016 and released a compilation album, Chapter One, on 2 June 2017.

In early 2021 Lemaitre released the single Trip Sitter together with Sofiloud. This was then followed by the releases of the single Sparrow with Emelie Hollow in June, the single OK Computer with RebMoe in August, and Reflection in early September. The final single, What About U, featuring Anna of the North was released on 22 October, alongside an announcement for their debut album Substellar, released 19 November 2021.

History

2010–2014: Formation and early years

During an interview, Lund and Jansen explained that the band is named after Georges Lemaître, a Belgian priest who first proposed the Big Bang Theory and derived the physics concept now referred to as Hubble's Law. In a 2014 music discovery piece with Interview magazine, Jansen further added "Le maitre" means "the master" in French, though the pair were unaware of this when first choosing a name for the project.

Lemaitre's first track was titled "Momentum", now dating  years since its initial release. This track was one of two tracks released prior to releasing their debut EP, The Friendly Sound—the other being "Primeval Atom".

Relativity series

Lemaitre is most commonly recognized for their series of EPs: the Relativity Series. This series consists of the following EPs: Relativity 1, Relativity 2, Relativity 3, and Relativity By Nite. The duo was praised for their use of all original samples.

Relativity By Nite was differed from most of Lemaitre's previous EPs in that it was longer in comparison to previous EP releases and almost entirely consisted of unheard remixes and instrumental pieces.

Lemaitre's third EP and second in the Relativity Series, Relativity 2, topped the Canadian charts and US iTunes electronic albums category during May of 2012. The EP went to top charts across a number of countries, placing #3 in Switzerland, #8 in Australia and #10 in France. Worldwide, Relativity 2 charted at #4 in iTunes' Pop category.

Joining Astralwerks

In January 2014, the duo signed to Astralwerks Records: home to notable acts, including Daft Punk, whom Lemaitre has previously referenced as a significant source of inspiration for the group's music style. Consequently, Lemaitre had the opportunity to work on remixes for other Astralwerks artists, such as Porter Robinson. Jansen and Lund are credited and featured on the song "Polygon Dust" from Porter Robinson's album, Worlds.

Furthermore, Lemaitre mentioned that the 'choice [to join Astralwerks] felt right', especially given that the label was home to some their own "sonic heroes", namely Daft Punk and The Chemical Brothers.

2014–present: 1749, Chapter One, Fast Lovers and Substellar
On 29 January 2016, the duo released their seventh EP, 1749. The name "1749"  was inspired by the home Lemaitre has been living in during their time in Los Angeles—which also serves as a low budget–home studio for the pair. The home was previously owned by famed American rapper and producer Dr. Dre during the 1990s.

Following the release of 1749, Lemaitre embarked on a short 7-city European tour during February, including a stop in their homeland in Oslo, Norway. During this time, the music video for the song "Stepping Stone" featuring artist Mark Johns, a member of Skrillex's Owsla creative collective, was released on 18 February 2016.

Jansen and Lund have appeared in festivals such as Coachella in April and Findings Festival at Norway in the late summer.

On 2 June 2017, the duo released their first album, Chapter One.

Their eighth EP, titled Fast Lovers, was released on 1 March 2019.

In 2020 they released four singles.

In 2021 they released a series of singles culminating in their debut album Substellar, released 19 November 2021.

Appearances in media
Several of Lemaitre's songs were featured mainstream media adverts. The song "1:18" from Lemaitre's debut EP, The Friendly Sound appeared in Apple's product advert "Designed Together", which showcased the then newly released iPhone 5c's fluent integration with the iOS 7 mobile operating system. Additionally, on 4 February 2016, Lemaitre's song "Blue Shift" received worldwide attention on Facebook for Facebook's 12th Anniversary, which came to be known as "Friends' Day", a feature that compiled of photos and memories commemorating friendship into user-specific videos.

In March 2016, it was announced that Lemaitre, along with other musical acts AlunaGeorge and Broiler, were collaborating with video game Minecraft to "perform a show in the game setting", as a part of Norwegian game conference The Gathering. The event provided users with the unique experience of a concert "simultaneously recreated within the Minecraft world [...] Just like a real concert[.]" This event was considered as the world's "first live Minecraft concert,".

On 4 October 2016, their song "Closer" was played in a video for the newly launched Google Pixel phone.

On 8 & 9 April 2017, their song "Closer" was also being used by Patrouille de France the French aerobatic jet team (similar to the Thunderbirds) during their high speed, supersonic performance at Maxwell AFB, Montgomery Alabama.

The song "Closer" also appeared in the first episode of the first season of the Norwegian teen drama Skam.

In 2017, their song "Stepping Stone" was featured in the soundtrack for the PlayStation 4 racing game Gran Turismo Sport.

Discography

Studio albums

Chapter One

Substellar

Extended plays (EPs)

The Friendly Sound

Relativity 1

Relativity 2

Relativity 3

Relativity By Nite

Singularity

Singularity (Remixed)

1749

Afterglow

Fast Lovers

JGM

Non-album singles

Remixes

Guest appearances

Music videos and filmography

References

External links

 
 
 
 
 Interview Magazine article on Lemaitre
 Lively interview with Lemaitre
 EDM Chicago interview with Lemaitre
 Aesthetica interview with Lemaitre
 Goblin Mag interview with Lemaitre
 Radio.com interview with Lemaitre
 Beatport article on Lemaitre

Electronic music duos
Musical groups established in 2010
Musical groups from Oslo
Norwegian electronic music groups
2010 establishments in Norway